The 2015 Africa U-23 Cup of Nations is an international football tournament that is to be held in Senegal from 28 November to 12 December 2015.

The 8 under-23 national teams involved in the tournament were required to register a squad of 21 players. Only players in these squads were eligible to take part in the tournament. All players must be born on or after 1 January 1993.

Players marked in boldface have been capped at full international level.

Group A

Head coach: Serigne Saliou Dia

Head coach: Owen Da Gama

Head coach: Maher Kanzari

Head coach: Fighton Simukonda

Group B

Head coach:  Pierre-André Schürmann

Head coach: Hossam El-Badry

Head coach: Cheick Oumar Kone

Head coach: Samson Siasia

References

2015 Africa U-23 Cup of Nations